Lawman Without a Gun (also known as This Man Stands Alone) is a 1978 American made-for-television drama film starring Louis Gossett Jr., written and directed by Jerrold Freedman.

Plot
A black man runs for the position of sheriff in a small town. This movie is about Dr. Rev. Thomas Earl Gilmore Sr. Raised in Forkland, Alabama and known as the “sheriff without a gun,” he became the first black sheriff of Greene County and the second black sheriff in the state of Alabama.
He died in 2015.

Cast
Louis Gossett Jr. as Tom Hayward
Clu Gulager as Marvin Tayman
Mary Alice as Minnie Hayward
Barry Brown as Fred Tayman
Barton Heyman as George Tayman
James McEachin as Harris McIntyre
Lonny Chapman as Sheriff Harvey Johnson

References

External links

1978 television films
1978 films
1978 drama films
Films about racism
Films about race and ethnicity
Films about human rights
NBC network original films
Films directed by Jerrold Freedman
American drama television films
1970s American films